Halichoeres inornatus, the cape wrasse, is a species of wrasse native to the eastern Pacific Ocean from Baja California to Colombia, including  Cocos Island, Malpelo Island, and the Galapagos. This species was previously treated as the only known member of the genus Sagittalarva.

References

Labridae
Taxa named by Charles Henry Gilbert
Fish described in 1890